This is a list of naval ships of the Military of the United Arab Emirates.

Corvettes
 Gowind-class (2 ships planned)
 Abu-Dhabi class (1 ship)
 Baynunah class (6 ships)
 Muray Jib class (2 ships)
 Muray Jib
 Das

Offshore patrol vessel 
 Arialah-class (2 ships)
 Falaj 2 class (2 ships)
 Ganthoot
 Qarnen
 Falaj 3 class (4 ships planned)

Fast attack craft 
 Mubarraz class
 Mubarraz
 Makasib
 Ban Yas class
 Ban Yas
 Marban
 Rodom
 Shaheen
 Sagar
 Tarif
 Ardhana class
 Ardhana
 Zurara
 Murban
 Al Ghullan
 Radoom
 Ghanadhah

Minesweepers 
 Frankenthal class
 Al Murjan
 Al Hasbah

Ships of the United Arab Emirates Navy
United Arab Emirates